Variable refresh rate (VRR) refers to a dynamic display that can continuously and seamlessly change its refresh rate without user input. A display supporting a variable refresh rate usually supports a specific range of refresh rates (e.g. 30 Hertz through 144 Hertz). This is called the variable refresh rate range (VRR range). The refresh rate can continuously vary seamlessly anywhere within this range.

Purpose 

On displays with a fixed refresh rate, a frame can only be shown on the screen at specific intervals, evenly spaced apart. If a new frame is not ready when that interval arrives, then the old frame is held on screen until the next interval (stutter) or a mixture of the old frame and the completed part of the new frame is shown (tearing). Conversely, if the frame is ready before the interval arrives, then it won't be shown until that interval arrives.

Variable refresh rates eliminate these issues by matching the refresh rates of a display to be in sync with the frame rate from a video input, making the display motion more smooth. Although VRR is strongly associated with video games due to such content having unpredictable, discontinuous frame rates and thus most maximally benefit from the technology, VRR is also useful as well even for media whose frame rate is fixed and known in advance, such as movies and video, by being able to automatically match the refresh rate to the various frame rates used as industry standard (24, 30, and 60 FPS), again eliminating screen tearing. In this regard, VRR can save power by not needlessly refreshing the display when no new frame is being pushed out; furthering this, VRR also has use in power management, by temporarily lowering the refresh rate of a display during instances when there is little movement on the screen to save power.

History 

Vector displays had a variable refresh rate on their cathode ray tube (CRT), depending on the number of vectors on the screen, since more vectors took more time to draw on their screen.

Since the 2010s decade, raster displays gained several industry standards for variable refresh rates. Historically, there was only a limited selection of fixed refresh rates for common display modes.

Implementations 

Variable refresh rate display technologies include several industry standards and proprietary standards:

 AMD FreeSync
 Nvidia G-Sync
 VESA Adaptive-Sync press release
 HDMI 2.1 Variable Refresh Rate (VRR)
 Apple ProMotion
Qualcomm Q-Sync

References

External links 

 TestUFO Animation: Variable Refresh Rate Simulation

Graphics hardware
Temporal rates